Szymura is a Polish surname. It may refer to:

 Franciszek Szymura (1912–1985), Polish boxer
 Kamil Szymura (born 1990), Polish footballer
 Rafał Szymura (born 1995), Polish volleyball player
 Jacek M. Szymura (born 1949), Polish zoologist and evolutionary biologist

See also
 

Polish-language surnames